Nocomis is a genus of cyprinid fish native to North America.  There are currently seven described species in this genus.

Species
 Nocomis asper Lachner & R. E. Jenkins, 1971 (Redspot chub)
 Nocomis biguttatus (Kirtland, 1840) (Hornyhead chub)
 Nocomis effusus Lachner & R. E. Jenkins, 1967 (Redtail chub)
 Nocomis leptocephalus (Girard, 1856) (Bluehead chub)
 Nocomis micropogon (Cope, 1865) (River chub)
 Nocomis platyrhynchus Lachner & R. E. Jenkins, 1971 (Bigmouth chub)
 Nocomis raneyi Lachner & R. E. Jenkins, 1971 (Bull chub)

References
 

 
Fish of North America